Jessie Paul is a marketing specialist, founder, CEO of a marketing advisory firm, a public speaker, and an author. She was formerly chief marketing officer of Wipro IT Business and Global Brand Manager at Infosys Technologies Ltd.

Paul is an independent director in the board of directors with SQS India BFSI Limited, Expleo Solutions, Bajaj Consumer Care, Royal Orchid Hotels, CreditAccess Grameen.

Education and personal life
She started her education at a convent in Delhi, did 2nd to 5th grade in Sydney, Australia, and completed her schooling from an all girls school in her native village of Nazareth, Tamil Nadu.

Jessie Paul holds a bachelor's degree in Computer Science and an Engineering degree from National Institute of Technology, Tiruchirappalli and an MBA in Marketing from Indian Institute of Management Calcutta.

Jessie Paul is married and has one daughter. She resides in Bengaluru, India.

Career
After graduating from NIT, she joined the technology design firm, Tata Elxsi, as a trainer and part of the sales support team.

Paul had worked for almost 15 years in companies including O&M, Infosys and iGate. In 1998, Paul worked at Infosys as a Global Brand Manager. Her role included heading the set up of the company's marketing team and field marketing programs like the Wharton Infosys Business Transformation Award, which she anchored. During her time, Infosys also received the US-based IT Services Marketing Association’s Diamond Award. She was also part of the team which was involved in the NASDAQ listing of Infosys’ American Depositary Shares in 1999.

Paul left Infosys to join a start-up back-office firm Quintant Corporation in 2003 as its Global Marketing Head. Quintant was soon after acquired by iGate Corp where she then worked for two years.

In 2005, Paul became Chief Marketing Officer and led a team of 50 as Head of Marketing at Wipro. She created the shared-marketing unit and devised strategies for Wipro Technologies and Wipro Infotech.

Paul quit Wipro Technologies  in 2009 to start her own venture, Paul Writer Strategic Advisory. Paul is recognized for her contribution towards making the Indian IT industry well-known globally. She has been named one of the most influential women in information technology in India.

Publications 
 Marketing Booster Magazine- India's first ever marketing magazine
 "What Motivates You?" - A book review of Payoff by Dan Ariely in Outlook Business
 No Money Marketing- a guide for marketing on low budget

Honours and awards

 Chairman's Award, Infosys, 1998
 DataQuest's list of most powerful women in IT in India, 2005
 Business Today's List of Women Achievers in India, 2007
 IT People's Award for Women in Leadership, 2008
 Speaker at India Conference at Harvard Business School, 2016
 Featured in “Building a Global Brand - the Case Study of Wipro” authored by Prof Bharath Rao of Polytechnic University, NY, USA. 
 Featured in Wipro Building a Global B2B Brand by Amitava Chattopadhyay of INSEAD, 2009.

References

External links
 

Living people
Indian Institute of Management Calcutta alumni
Businesswomen from Tamil Nadu
Marketing women
Businesspeople from Tamil Nadu
National Institute of Technology, Tiruchirappalli alumni
Indian computer scientists
Indian women computer scientists
Indian women engineers
20th-century Indian engineers
Indian marketing people
Year of birth missing (living people)
Engineers from Tamil Nadu
20th-century women engineers
21st-century women engineers
20th-century Indian women
20th-century Indian people